Kilacheri is a village in Tamil Nadu, India. It is located in the Kadambatur taluka of the Tiruvallur district. Kilacheri Village is an administrative village in the Tiruvallur district of the Indian state of Tamil Nadu.

Nearby villages 
The following villages are surrounding villages to Kilacheri. The given distance are kilometer from Kilacheri and it is based on the straight line distance from Kilacheri.kottaiyur 5Km Mappedu 1.2 km, Kondancheri 1.7 km, Satharai 3.4 km, Pudumavilangai 3.6 km, Perambakkam 4.0 km, Koovam 4.3 km, Kannur 4.8 km, Kumaracheri 5.0 km, Pinjivakkam 5.2 km, Kadambathur 7.4 km, Ramankoil 7.5 km, Thirupandiyur 8.7 km, Kilnalathur 9.4 km, Polivakkam 9.5 km, Egattur 9.9 km, Valasaivettikadu 10.1 km, Vengathur 10.7 km, Adigathur 12.1 km, Vellerithangal 23.4 km

Demographics 

Tamil is the official language of the village, but nearly 45% of the people speak Telugu language (mostly Kamma (caste)). This place is in the border of Thiruvallur and Kanchipuram Districts.

Education 
 Christ College of Arts and Science
 St.Joseph's Boys Hr.Sec.School
 Sacred Heart Girls Hr.Sec.School
 St. Ignatius Boys Primary School
 St. Anne's Girls Primary School
 St. Joseph's Hospital
 St. Joseph's Seminary

Places of worship 

 Sacred Heart Church (established in 1786)

Two independent Telugu Christian migrations took place in the 18th century. One of that refers to the history of the Kilacheri Church.

In 1786 this Telugu Mission consisting of 300 families migrated from Oleroo on the banks of Krishna in the Guntur district, under the guidance of their Priest Rev Fr Mannenti.

This migrated Mission settled on the large tract of waste land, in the villages of Cooum Mappaydoo and Cotoor, obtained from the Government.

In 1886 it came under the Archdiocese of Madras and in 1952 it came under the jurisdiction of the Archdiocese of Madras – Mylapore.

The 300th Jubilee of all the Telugu Christians was celebrated on 11 December 2003 in this Parish.

Kilacheri Parishioners celebrate their church festival on May 28 each year.

Catholic Population: 2,100

Sunday Mass – Timings & Language: 6.30 am & 8.30 – Tamil

Monday- Saturday – Timings & language: 6.30am

Sub - stations with Chapel

01 Fatima Madha Chapel, Fatimpuram 1 km

02 Loudru Madha Chapel, Mettu Colony, 2 km

03 St Antony's Bajanai Sangam, Govindamedu, 0.5 km
 Stations of the Cross

Stations of the Cross or the Way of the Cross, also known as Way of Sorrows or Via Crucis, refers to a series of images depicting Jesus Christ on the day of his crucifixion and accompanying prayers.

Located around the Sacred Heart Church, Kilacheri

Notable people 

Mother Gnanamma

Mother Gnanamma declared Servant of God 

Mother Thatipatri Gnanamma, founder of the congregations of St. Anne, Madras, and St. Anne, Phirangipuram, has been declared Servant of God, which will lead to her Beatification and Canonization. The Society of Sisters of St. Anne has more than 110 institutions, in five states of India and in a few countries abroad.

Archbishop Samineni Arulappa

Archbishop Samineni Arulappa (28 August 1924 – 13 February 2005), often shortened to  S Arulappa, was an Indian Roman Catholic clergyman who served as the Archbishop of Hyderabad from December 1971 through January 2000. The youngest priest to be consecrated to such a high office, he was also the longest-serving Catholic Archbishop in India. He was also the first Archbishop who had the honor of being consecrated by Pope Paul VI in Rome.

References

External links 
 A documentary video about Kilacheri

Villages in Tiruvallur district